Among the many Ottoman provinces (eyalets or vilayets) that were created during the centuries-long history of the Ottoman Empire, some existed for relatively short amounts of time, either because they were ceded to foreign powers, obtained independence, or were simply merged with other provinces.

Eyalets

 The Eyalet of Tiflis was taken from Kartli in 1578/9, but the country proved difficult to subdue: Tiflis was lost in 1583, the Ottomans then lost the whole land except for Lori and Gori, and both were made eyalets in place of Tiflis, but were later lost in 1590 and 1599 respectively.
 The Eyalet of Kakheti was nominally an eyalet in 1578, when King Alexander was made a beylerbeyi of his own kingdom.
 The Eyalet of Shirvan existed from 1578 to 1604, it had previously been an Ottoman vassal for some years after 1533.
 The Eyalet of Dagestan was conquered in 1578 and remained an eyalet until the beginning of the next century.
 The Eyalet of Saruhan was an eyalet of the Ottoman Empire from 1845 to 1847.
 The Eyalet of Sigetvar was formed in c. 1596 and existed until 1600. It included parts of present-day Hungary and Croatia. The capital was Szigetvár. It was later transferred to Kanije Eyalet.
 The Eyalet of Kurdistan (Ottoman language: , Eyâlet-i Kurdistân) existed from 1847 to 1867 ( years). Confusingly, some neighbouring eyalets, such as Sharazor, were also sometimes referred to as "Kurdistan". It was established by the Ottoman Empire following the suppression of Bedirhan Bey's revolt in 1847. On December 14, 1847, the Ottoman State newspaper - Takvim-i Vekayi Gazetesi - carried an official notice announcing the establishment of 'the Province of Kurdistan'. The area of the eyalet was populated mainly by Kurdish speaking Muslims. As to its yearbook, it included Hakkâri, Dêrsîm, and Diyâr-ı Bekr in 1849. The territorial setup was later altered and it was disbanded in 1867.
 Nakhichevan Eyalet

Vilayets

 Dersim Vilayet or Hozat Vilayet: existed from 1879 to 1886 ( years); the capital was Tunceli.
 Hakkari Vilayet existed from 1876 to 1888 ( years); the capital was Hakkari.
 Karasi Vilayet existed from 1881 to 1888 ( years); the capital was Karesi.
 Prizren Vilayet existed from 1868 or 1871 to 1877 ( years). It was created by joining the Sanjak of Prizren together with the Sanjak of Dibra, Sanjak of Skopje and Sanjak of Niš into one vilayet. In 1874, the seat of the vilayet was moved to Pristina. It became part of the Kosovo Vilayet, which was established in 1877.
Mahmud Nedim Pasha created a new short lived province in 1875, by separating Herzegovina from Bosnia and adjoining it to Novi Pazar province. A year later, Herzegovina was reincorporated back into Bosnia Vilayet in 1876.
Hatt-ı Üstuva (Equatoria) Vilayet attached to the Ottoman controlled Khedivate of Egypt (before: Egypt Eyalet), and existed for 10 years starting with the conquest of Northern Ugandan lands such as Wadelai by commissioners like Emin Pasha and Samuel Baker of the Sudan area; which was claimed both by Turko-Egyptian rulers and British officials in 1872 and lasting until the definite British occupation of Ottoman controlled Khedivate of Egypt's southern regions.

References

Subdivisions of the Ottoman Empire